R v O'Connor, [1995] 4 S.C.R. 411 is a leading Supreme Court of Canada decision on disclosure of medical records. O’Connor was accused of and charged with rape and indecent assault of four women. The Court held that the medical and counselling records of a complainant in a sexual assault case that are held by a third party can be disclosed by order of the judge if they meet two requirements.

First, the applicant must establish, without seeing them, that the records are likely to be relevant to the case. Second, the judge must review the records and decide whether to disclose them based on the balancing the right to make full answer and defence, and the right to privacy.

The O'Connor involved in the case was Hubert Patrick O'Connor, a Catholic bishop from British Columbia who was found guilty of sex crimes in 1991.

See also
 List of Supreme Court of Canada cases (Lamer Court)
 R v Mills (1999)

References

External links
 

Supreme Court of Canada cases
1995 in Canadian case law
Rape in Canada
Canadian evidence case law
Publication bans in Canadian case law
Sexual abuse of women in the Catholic Church